Robert Christen Swift (born December 3, 1985) is an American professional basketball player who last played for Spanish club Círculo Gijón Baloncesto y Conocimiento of the LEB Plata league. He played in the National Basketball Association for the Seattle SuperSonics / Oklahoma City Thunder from 2004 through 2009, for the Seattle Aviators and Snohomish County Explosion of the National Athletic Basketball League in 2010, and for the Tokyo Apache of the bj League in 2010–11.

High school
Swift caught the attention of NBA and college scouts while playing for Garces Memorial High School, and then later as the centerpiece of the Bakersfield High School team.

During his time at Garces, the small Catholic high school broke into the USA Today top-25 high school basketball team rankings. Between his junior and senior years, Swift transferred from Garces to Highland High School, and then just before his senior year, he transferred to Bakersfield High School. This move provoked a hearing by the California Interscholastic Federation that initially declared Swift ineligible for the 2003–04 season; however, this ruling was later overturned and he played his senior season. He committed to attend the University of Southern California (USC) to play for the USC Trojans men's basketball team on a scholarship.

National Basketball Association
Swift was selected by the Seattle SuperSonics in the first round with the twelfth overall pick in the 2004 NBA draft. Swift bypassed college and opted for the NBA, turning down his commitment to play for USC.

In his first season with the Sonics, Swift played in 16 games, averaging 4.5 minutes, 0.9 points, 0.4 rebounds, and 0.4 blocks per game. In his second season, under the direction of coach Bob Hill, he started 20 out of 47 games, averaging 21 minutes, 6.4 points, 5.6 rebounds, and 1.2 blocks per game.

In 2006, the Sonics anticipated that Swift would become their starting center. Swift was awarded the starting job at center but he ruptured the anterior crucial ligament in his right knee after playing just over one minute in a preseason game vs the Sacramento Kings. The resulting injury occurred when he twisted his right knee when he fell and went out of bounds awkwardly in front of the Seattle bench. Swift suffered another injury to his right knee in February 2008, a torn lateral meniscus.

Swift's final NBA game was played on April 13, 2009 in a 83 - 113 loss to the Portland Trail Blazers where he recorded 2 points, 3 rebounds and 2 blocks. On December 22, 2009, the Oklahoma City Thunder renounced the rights to Swift.

D-League and Japan
In 2009, Swift joined the Bakersfield Jam of the NBA D-League. However, he left the team for personal reasons after appearing in two games. He was overweight and experienced a decrease in mobility.

During the 2010–11 season, Swift played for Tokyo Apache with his former head coach in Seattle, Bob Hill. Swift played well, receiving interest from the NBA's Boston Celtics and New York Knicks. Following the 2011 Tōhoku earthquake and tsunami, the Apache ended their season prematurely and disbanded. Swift tried out for the Portland Trail Blazers in April 2011, but was not offered a contract.

Spain
On 12 February 2018, Swift returned to play basketball after agreeing a two-year contract with Spanish fifth tier club Círculo Gijón.

In his second season in Spain, the club achieved a vacant place in the professional third-tier league, LEB Plata. He left the team after the end of the season averaging 9.1 points and 4.8 rebounds per game. However, Swift came back to Círculo Gijón on 29 December 2019.

Personal life
Robert's father, Bruce, was unable to work for two years due to a car accident that occurred while Robert was a child. He filed for bankruptcy twice: in 1999 and 2003. Robert's mother, Rhonda, was diagnosed with cancer and had multiple surgeries to remove it. The Swifts dealt with food insecurity.

In 2009, Swift's girlfriend became pregnant. In June 2011, Swift was arrested for driving under the influence. He was found guilty of reckless driving.

In 2013, Swift refused to vacate his foreclosed home, which had been bought by a new owner. The new owner bought the house in Sammamish, Washington, in January 2013 for half the price Swift paid in 2006.  Swift eventually left the home, which was reportedly riddled with animal feces, guns, bullets, beer bottles, and garbage. Observers also noted old letters from some of the top college basketball programs in the country trying to recruit Swift, before he went straight to the NBA from high school.

In October 2014, police raided the house of Trygve Bjorkstam, an alleged heroin and methamphetamine dealer, who had a collection of 18 guns. They found Swift living in the home, and in possession of a sawed-off shotgun. In November 2014, police charged Swift with unlawful possession of a short-barreled shotgun.

On January 8, 2015, Swift was arrested by police for involvement in an armed home invasion attempt. Swift claimed he was high on drugs at the time of the incident.

NBA career statistics

Regular season 

|-
| style="text-align:left;"| 
| style="text-align:left;"| Seattle
| 16 || 0 || 4.5 || .455 || .000 || .556 || .3 || .1 || .1 || .4 || 1.0
|-
| style="text-align:left;"| 
| style="text-align:left;"| Seattle
| 47 || 20 || 21.0 || .515 || .000 || .582 || 5.6 || .2 || .3 || 1.2 || 6.4
|-
| style="text-align:left;"| 
| style="text-align:left;"| Seattle
| 8 || 4 || 12.3 || .353 || .000 || 1.000 || 2.3 || .1 || .6 || .8 || 2.0
|-
| style="text-align:left;"| 
| style="text-align:left;"| Oklahoma City
| 26 || 10 || 13.2 || .521 || .000 || .750 || 3.4 || .3 || .2 || .7 || 3.3
|- class="sortbottom"
| style="text-align:center;" colspan="2"| Career
| 97 || 34 || 15.5 || .506 || .000 || .610 || 4.0 || .2 || .3 || .9 || 4.3

See also
List of oldest and youngest National Basketball Association players

References

External links 
 Chris Ballard: Out From The Darkness: Robert Swift's road from NBA lottery pick to drug addict to... Sports Illustrated,  21 September 2016.

1985 births
Living people
American expatriate basketball people in Japan
American expatriate basketball people in Spain
American men's basketball players
American people of Okinawan descent
American sportspeople of Japanese descent
Bakersfield Jam players
Basketball players from Bakersfield, California
Centers (basketball)
Círculo Gijón players
McDonald's High School All-Americans
National Basketball Association high school draftees
Oklahoma City Thunder players
Parade High School All-Americans (boys' basketball)
Seattle SuperSonics draft picks
Seattle SuperSonics players
Tokyo Apache players